is a standard package distributed by the Linux Kernel Organization for use as part of the Linux operating system.

Contents

Included
It includes the following utilities:

Removed
Utilities formerly included, but removed :

 arch
 chkdupexe
 clock
 cytune
 ddate (removed from default build before being removed altogether)
 elvtune
 fastboot
 fasthalt
 halt
 initctl
 ramsize (formerly a symlink to rdev)
 rdev
 reboot
 rootflags (formerly a symlink to rdev)
 shutdown
 simpleinit
 tailf
 vidmode (formerly a symlink to rdev)

See also
 BusyBox
 cat (Unix)
 CUPS
 GNU Core Utilities
 Toybox
 uname

References

External links
 The util-linux code repository.
 pub/linux/utils/util-linux on Kernel.org
 util-linux development discussion and bug reporting mailing list
 Karel Zak's blog, the blog of the current maintainer

Linux
Hardware in Linux
Free system software
Free software programmed in C